Remembrance is a lost 1922 American silent drama film written and directed by Rupert Hughes and starring Claude Gillingwater. It was produced and distributed by Goldwyn Pictures.

Cast
Claude Gillingwater as John P. Grout
Kate Lester as Mrs. Grout
Patsy Ruth Miller as Mab
Cullen Landis as Seth Smith
Max Davidson as Georges Cartier
Richard Tucker as J. P. Grout Jr.
Dana Todd as Ethelwolf Grout
Nell Craig as Julia
Esther Ralston as Beatrice
Helen Hayward as Mrs. Frish
Lucille Ricksen as Child
Arthur Trimble as Child
William A. Carroll as MacClune
Guinn "Big Boy" Williams (uncredited)

References

External links

1922 films
Lost American films
Goldwyn Pictures films
American silent feature films
Films based on works by Rupert Hughes
American black-and-white films
Silent American drama films
1922 drama films
Films directed by Rupert Hughes
1922 lost films
Lost drama films
1920s American films